Holmes Mill is an unincorporated community in Harlan County, Kentucky, United States. The population of Holmes Mill is 259 people.

References

Unincorporated communities in Harlan County, Kentucky
Unincorporated communities in Kentucky